Montalvin Manor (formerly, Montalvin) is a census-designated place (CDP) in Contra Costa County, California. It lies at an elevation of 69 feet (21 m). For census purposes, it formed part of Bayview-Montalvin, California until 2010, when it became a separate CDP with a population of 2,876.  The other half of the old CDP became Bayview.

Despite its location outside San Pablo city limits, Montalvin Manor uses San Pablo mailing addresses.

Demographics
At the 2010 census Montalvin Manor had a population of 2,876. The racial makeup of Montalvin Manor was 1,295 (45.0%) White, 222 (7.7%) African American, 36 (1.3%) Native American, 306 (10.6%) Asian, 27 (0.9%) Pacific Islander, 855 (29.7%) from other races, and 135 (4.7%) from two or more races. Hispanic or Latino of any race were 1,800 persons (62.6%).

The census reported that 2,869 people (99.8% of the population) lived in households, 7 (0.2%) lived in non-institutionalized group quarters, and no one was institutionalized.

There were 818 households, 337 (41.2%) had children under the age of 18 living in them, 411 (50.2%) were opposite-sex married couples living together, 122 (14.9%) had a female householder with no husband present, 60 (7.3%) had a male householder with no wife present.  There were 50 (6.1%) unmarried opposite-sex partnerships, and 11 (1.3%) same-sex married couples or partnerships. 186 households (22.7%) were one person and 109 (13.3%) had someone living alone who was 65 or older. The average household size was 3.51.  There were 593 families (72.5% of households); the average family size was 4.11.

The age distribution was 738 people (25.7%) under the age of 18, 319 people (11.1%) aged 18 to 24, 742 people (25.8%) aged 25 to 44, 712 people (24.8%) aged 45 to 64, and 365 people (12.7%) who were 65 or older.  The median age was 35.2 years. For every 100 females, there were 93.1 males.  For every 100 females age 18 and over, there were 92.3 males.

There were 895 housing units at an average density of ,of which 818 were occupied, 621 (75.9%) by the owners and 197 (24.1%) by renters.  The homeowner vacancy rate was 5.3%; the rental vacancy rate was 8.4%.  2,000 people (69.5% of the population) lived in owner-occupied housing units and 869 people (30.2%) lived in rental housing units.

Education
It is in the West Contra Costa Unified School District.

References

Census-designated places in Contra Costa County, California
Census-designated places in California